Album of the Year is an Aotearoa Music Award that honours New Zealand music artists for outstanding album. The award was first awarded in 1973 as part of the Recording Arts Talent Awards (RATA). Singer-songwriter Bic Runga has won the award twice, in 1998 and 2006, while singer-songwriter Dave Dobbyn has won once as a solo artist in 1998 and twice with his band DD Smash in 1982 and 1983.

Recipients

References 

Album of the Year
Awards established in 1973
Album awards